Daphne Christina May (30 March 1961 – 26 March 2022), known professionally as Tina May, was an English jazz vocalist.

Early life and career
The younger of two daughters born to Harry May and Daphne E. Walton, May lived in Frampton-on-Severn when she was young and attended Stroud High School and later Cheltenham Ladies' College. She played clarinet from an early age, before studying classical singing at Cheltenham. She began singing jazz while attending Cardiff University. May recorded numerous albums for 33 Jazz Records. She also worked with Tony Coe, Nikki Iles, Stan Sulzmann, Ray Bryant, Enrico Pieranunzi and Patrick Villanueva.

May also lectured and taught extensively; her employers included Trinity College of Music, Leeds College of Music, Birmingham Conservatoire, the Royal Academy of Music, the Royal Welsh College of Music and Drama, and the University of West London. In addition, she regularly attached workshops and masterclasses to her own tours.

Personal life
In 1989, May married Clark Tracey, with whom she recorded several albums in the 1990s. They later divorced and, at the time of her death, May's partner of roughly two and a half years was saxophonist Simon Spillett.

Discography

As leader
 Never Let Me Go (33 Records, 1992)
 Fun (33 Records, 1993)
 It Ain't Necessarily So (33 Records, 1994)
 Time Will Tell (33 Records, 1995)
 Jazz Piquant with Tony Coe (33 Records, 1998)
 Change of Sky with Nikki Iles (33 Records, 1998)
 One Fine Day (33 Records, 1999)
 Live in Paris (33 Records, 2000)
 The Ella Fitzgerald Songbook Revisted with Lee Gibson, Barbara Jay (Spotlite, 2000)
 I'll Take Romance (Linn, 2003)
 Early May (33 Records, 2004)
 More Than You Know with Tony Coe, Nikki Iles (33 Records, 2004)
 A Wing and a Prayer (33 Records, 2006)
 Sings the Ray Bryant Songbook (33 Records, 2006)
 Out of the Blue with Ray Guntrip (rayguntripmusic.com, 2008)
 I Never Told You (33 Records, 2009)
 Tina May Sings Piaf (33 Records, 2011)
 Where You Belong with Ray Guntrip (rayguntripmusic.com, 2011)
 No More Hanky Panky (33 Records, 2011)
 Troubadours with Dylan Fowler (33 Records, 2013)
 Divas (Hep, 2013)
 My Kinda Love (Hep, 2014)
 Home Is Where the Heart Is with Enrico Pieranunzi (33 Records, 2015)
 Musica Paradiso: Songs and Stories from the Silver Screen with Guillermo Rozenthuler (2016)
 Telling Jokes with Steve Plews (ASC, 2016)
 Cafe Paranoia: Tina May Sings Mark Murphy with Andy Lutter (33 Records, 2017)
 52nd Street: Tina May Sings the Songs of Duncan Lamont (33 Records, 2021)

As guest
 1994 Transatlantic Airs with Michael Hashim (33 Jazz)
 2000 Ellington's Sacred Music with Stan Tracey Jazz Orchestra & the Durham Cathedral Choir (33 Jazz)
 2007 Cornucopia 2 with Humphrey Lyttelton (Caligraph)
 2011 I'm Sorry, I Haven't a Clue: Humph Celebration Concert (AudioGO)

References

Further reading

Articles
 
 Masarick, Jack. "Soaring free as the Bird". Evening Standard. 30 September 1988. p. 36
 Gelly, Dave. "More Music". The Observer. 29 April 1992.
 "Perth date for jazz singer Tina May". The Perthshire Advertiser. 19 November 1993. p. 15
 Hadsley, Neville. "Tina's Breath of Fresh Air: Tina tells Neville Hadsley why she chose path of jazz singer instead of actress". The Birmingham Post. 22 November 1993. p. 14 
 Gelly, Dave. "Jazz Releases". The Observer. 31 July 1994.
 Lacey, Hester. "How We Met: Rory Bremner and Tina May". The Independent. 13 August 1995.
 May, Tina. "Jazz Essentials: Tina May on Carmen McCrae". The Guardian. 1 March 1996.
 Genay, Rosalie. "Tina May Talks to Rosalie Genay". ReVoice. 16 September 2013.
 Clarke, Colin. "Telling Jokes". Fanfare. March/April 2017.

Books
 Jazz: The Rough Guide (1995) by Ian Carr, Digby Fairweather, Brian Priestly and Chris Parker
 The Penguin Jazz Guide. The History of 1001 Best Albums by Brian Morton and Richard Cook 
 The Jazz Singers. The Ultimate Guide by Scott Yanow. Backbeat Books (Hal Leonard)
 Jazz Writings by Nathan Davis

External links
 Tina May's Web site
 
 
 My Life in Music - Tina May. YouTube

1961 births
2022 deaths
20th-century English women singers
20th-century English singers
21st-century English women singers
21st-century English singers
British lyricists
British women jazz singers
British music educators
Women music educators
Voice teachers
English jazz singers
English stage actresses
English sopranos
People from Gloucester
People educated at Stroud High School
Alumni of Cardiff University
Musicians from Gloucestershire